Siega Verde is an archaeological site in Serranillo, Villar de la Yegua, province of Salamanca, in Castile and León, Spain. It was added to the Côa Valley Paleolithic Art site in the World Heritage List in 2010.

The site consists of a series of rock carvings, discovered in 1988 by professor Manuel Santoja Gómez, during an inventory campaign of archaeological sites in the valley of the Águeda river. Subjects include equids, aurochs, deer and goats, among the most common ones, as well as bison, reindeer and the woolly rhinoceros, which were not yet extinct at the time.

The engravings date to the Gravettian culture of the Upper Palaeolithic (circa 20,000 years ago). There are also more recent, anthropomorphic representations, dating to the Magdalenian age (c. 9,000 years ago). There is a total of 91 panels, spanning some 1 kilometers of rock.

References

External links
Siega Verde website
Page at Celtiberia.net 
 Explore the Prehistoric Rock Art Sites in the Côa Valley and Siega Verde in the UNESCO collection on Google Arts and Culture

Prehistoric sites in Spain
Prehistoric art
World Heritage Sites in Spain
Tourist attractions in Castile and León
Art of the Upper Paleolithic
Archaeological sites in Castile and León